Knee buckling is a symptom of knee instability that frequently affects older individuals,
especially when putting weight on the knees.

Notes 

Knee
Symptoms and signs: Nervous and musculoskeletal systems